Jaime Jorge Guzmán Errázuriz (June 28, 1946 – April 1, 1991) was a Chilean constitutional law professor, speechwriter and member and doctrinal founder of the conservative Independent Democrat Union party. In the 1960s he opposed the University Reform and became an avid organizer of the Gremialist movement. He opposed President Salvador Allende and later became a close advisor of Pinochet and his dictatorship. A professor of Constitutional Law, he played an important part in the drafting of the 1980 Chilean Constitution. He served briefly as senator during the  transition to democracy before being assassinated in 1991 by members of the communist urban guerrilla Manuel Rodríguez Patriotic Front.

Early life 

Jaime Guzmán was born in Santiago to Jorge Guzmán Reyes, who was a sports leader of the Catholic University, and Carmen Errázuriz Edwards, who was a travel agent for tourists in Europe. Between 1951 and 1962 he studied in the Colegio de los Sagrados Corazones de Santiago, where at a young age he showed interest in literature and strong leadership qualities. Already during his senior year he began to show interest in political life. An excellent student, he graduated from high school at the age of 15.

In 1963, only 16 years old, he was accepted to study law at the Pontifical Catholic University of Chile, graduating in 1968 with highest honours. He was awarded the Monseñor Carlos Casanueva prize for being the best student in his class.

During his university years he founded the Movimiento Gremial Universitario, a conservative political movement that in 1968 won the presidency of the student union of the Pontifical Catholic University of Chile, maintaining an almost uninterrupted leadership until NAU (Nueva Acción Universitaria), a left wing group, became majority since 2009. The Movimiento Gremial quickly expanded through the main universities in Chile.

According to Oscar Contardo he was identified as gay within a portfolio held by the National Intelligence Directorate.

After the 1973 coup 

After the military coup, Guzmán became a close advisor to General Augusto Pinochet and a highly influential policymaker in Chile at this time. Already two days after the coup Guzmán was tasked to study the creation of a new constitution. Later he was summoned by Pinochet to take part in the Comisión Ortúzar charged with drafting the new constitution. He also was a key participant in the drafting of Pinochet's Chacarillas speech of 1977, one of the founding texts of the military regime.

Enjoying close contacts with Jorge Alessandri, he converted himself to the neoliberal economic policies supported by the Chicago Boys and eventually distanced himself from Alessandri, while getting closer to Pinochet and to his minister Sergio Fernández.

Even though Guzmán never assumed any official position in the military dictatorship of Pinochet, he remained one of the closest collaborators, playing an important ideological role. He participated in the design of important speeches of Pinochet, and provided frequent political and doctrinal advice and consultancy.

Guzmán declared to have a "negative opinion" of National Intelligence Directorate director Manuel Contreras. According to him this lead him into various "inconviniencies and difficulties". From its side the National Intelligence Directorate identified Guzmán as an intelligent and manipulative actor in a secret 1976 memorandum. The same document posits Guzmán manipulated Pinochet and sought ultimately to displace him from power, to lead himself a government in collaboration with Jorge Alessandri. The National Intelligence Directorate spied on Guzmán and kept watch on his everyday activities.

During the democratic transition 
Following Chile's return to democracy, Jaime Guzmán presented himself as a candidate in the legislative elections. Despite coming third place, behind important figures of the Concertación, Andrés Zaldívar and Ricardo Lagos, he was still elected due to the binomial electoral system. 

Guzmán continued until his death his functions as a professor of constitutional law in the Faculty of Law of the Catholic University of Chile. He was known to have a vast knowledge of Scholasticism.

Death 

Guzmán died on 1 April 1991, shot at the exit of the Catholic University where he was a professor of constitutional law. He was driven to a nearby hospital and died three hours later from several bullet wounds. His assassination was carried out by members of the far-left urban guerrilla movement Frente Patriotico Manuel Rodriguez (FPMR), Ricardo Palma Salamanca and Raúl Escobar Poblete, however the operation is believed to have been planned by the leaders of the movement Galvarino Apablaza, Mauricio Hernández Norambuena and Juan Gutiérrez Fischmann. who had been planning the murder of Guzman since the 1980s.

Hernández (also known as "Commander Ramiro") was the only one arrested and tried for the murder of Guzmán, but after serving less than three years in a Chilean prison he escaped and sought refuge in Cuba. In 2002 Hernández was arrested in Brazil for the kidnapping of Brazilian businessman Washington Olivetto. He is currently serving a sentence in Chile.

The assassination of Guzmán prompted the Aylwin administration to create the intelligence organization La Oficina on April 26, 1991, to neutralize violent left-wing groups that had not accepted the premises of the Chilean transition to democracy.

A theory postulated by the sister of Guzmán and her son is that Manuel Contreras and Pinochet had infiltrated FPMR to induce the assassination. Allegedly the motivation was Guzmán's supposed proneness to collaborate with Chilean justice to clarify human rights violations.

Political views

At the age of 12 Jaime Guzmán participated in the political campaign of Jorge Alessandri distributing propaganda. About this Guzmán recognizes he had «a close ideological and personal proximity with Jorge Alessandri», he adds that «he was the person who influenced me most in my interest for politics. His presidential candidacy in 1958 and his presidency, between my 12 and 18 years, made me admire him as a superior man».

Guzmán was influenced by his teacher Jaime Eyzaguirre and by Plinio Corrêa de Oliveira. Regarding Juan Vázquez de Mella there has been a dispute on whether or not Jaime's gremialismo thought was influenced by him.

From about the time of 1973 Chilean coup d'état Guzmán became familiarized with the ideas of Milton Friedman and the Chicago School of Economics, this thanks to his contacts with Chicago Boys such as Miguel Kast.

According to historian Renato Cristi in the writing of the new Constitution of Chile Guzmán based his work on the pouvoir constituant concept used by Carl Schmitt, a German intellectual associated with Nazism, as well as in the ideas of market society of Friedrich Hayek. This way Guzmán enabled a framework for an authoritarian state with a free market system. In the aspects where Guzmán was not satisfied with Hayek's thought he found meaning in the Spanish translation of the book The Spirit of Democratic Capitalism by Michael Novak.

References 

1946 births
1991 deaths
Chilean anti-communists
J
Members of the Senate of Chile
Chilean people of Basque descent
Deaths by firearm in Chile
Assassinated Chilean politicians
Academic staff of the Pontifical Catholic University of Chile
Pontifical Catholic University of Chile alumni
Conservatism in Chile
Independent Democratic Union politicians
Speechwriters
Chilean scholars of constitutional law